Otter Rock may refer to:

Otter Rock (Antarctica), a rock formation off the coast of Trinity Peninsula
Otter Rock, Oregon, an unincorporated community in Lincoln County, Oregon, United States
"Otter Rock", a song by the Chemical Brothers, appearing on the album Singles 93–03

See also
Otter Island (disambiguation)